This article is an incomplete outline of terrorist incidents in Pakistan in 2023 in chronological order.

January
3 January – Two intelligence officers, including the director of the provincial counterterrorism department, were shot dead outside a restaurant in Khanewal, Punjab, by suspected Pakistani Taliban gunmen.
13 January – Sarband police station attack in Peshawar, Khyber Pakhtunkhwa.
15 January – A gunmen fled after shooting three officers at the post in Zardad Dahri, in Charsadda District, Khyber Pakhtunkhwa. Two of three soldiers died on way to hospital.
18 January – Four soldiers were killed in a cross-border attack from the Iranian border in Panjgur District, Balochistan.
19 January – Three police officers were killed in a suicide bombing at a police outpost in Khyber Pakhtunkhwa.
20 January – A bomb blast derailed a passenger train in Peshi, Kachhi District, Balochistan, injuring eight people.
30 January – 2023 Peshawar mosque bombing
31 January – A police station in Mianwali, Punjab, came under a gun attack by a group of militants. Police said that the attack was repulsed.

February
  17 February 2023 Karachi police station attack.
 26 February 2023 Barkhan blast.

March
 6 March – Bolan suicide bombing : A suicide bombing in Bolan, Balochistan, killed 8 policemen, 1 civilian and left several others injured.

References

 
2023
Pakistan